Jan Raa (born 11 October 1939) is a Norwegian biologist.

Raa was a professor at the University of Tromsø from 1972 to 1988, and has an honorary degree at the same university. After his tenure at the University of Tromsø he was a director at the Directorate of Fisheries Institute of Nutrition, research director at Fiskeriforskning and developer of the company Biotec Pharmacon.

He is a fellow of the Norwegian Academy of Science and Letters and the Norwegian Academy of Technological Sciences. In 2010 he was decorated as a Commander of the Order of St. Olav.

References

1939 births
Living people
Scientists from Bergen
Norwegian biologists
Academic staff of the University of Tromsø
Members of the Norwegian Academy of Science and Letters
Members of the Norwegian Academy of Technological Sciences
Norwegian businesspeople